Kokh may refer to:
 Kokh (tomb), a Middle Eastern type of tomb
 Kokh (wrestling), a traditional Armenian style of wrestling

See also
 KOKH-TV, a TV station in Oklahoma, United States
 Kokh Kox, a deity of the Noon people of Senegal
 Alfred Kokh, Russian writer and economist
 Koch (disambiguation)
 Koh (disambiguation)